The 2012 Victoria Curling Classic Invitational was held at the Archie Browning Sports Centre in Victoria, British Columbia from March 29 to April 1 as part of the 2011–12 World Curling Tour. The purse for the men's and women's events was CAD$72,000 and CAD$18,000, respectively.

Men

Teams

Results

A Event

B Event

C Event

Playoffs

Women

Teams

Round-robin standings

Round-robin results

Playoffs

External links

Victoria Curling Classic Invitational
Sports competitions in Victoria, British Columbia
Curling in British Columbia